Jaroslav Jirásek (6 June 1932 – 2 June 2012) was a Czech sprinter. He competed in the 4 × 400 metres relay at the 1956 Summer Olympics and the 1960 Summer Olympics.

References

External links
 

1932 births
2012 deaths
Athletes (track and field) at the 1956 Summer Olympics
Athletes (track and field) at the 1960 Summer Olympics
Czech male sprinters
Olympic athletes of Czechoslovakia
Place of birth missing